Forever Burned is the tenth compilation album by American experimental rock band Swans. It was given a limited release through the Young God Records website. It featured the entire The Burning World album followed by a few songs from White Light from the Mouth of Infinity, Love of Life and the Michael Gira version of Love Will Tear Us Apart. Tracks 1 to 10 are from The Burning World.

The record is out-of-print and no longer available from the Young God Records website.

Track listing 
Tracks 15 and 16 are listed in the reverse order that they appear on the CD.

Personnel

Michael Gira – vocals and guitars
Jarboe – vocals and keyboards
Norman Westberg – guitars
Christopher Hahn – guitars
Jenny Wade – bass
Vincent Signorelli – drums
Algis Kizys – bass
Virgil Moorefield – drums
Jason Anses – bass
Nicky Skopelitis – baglama and bazouki
Shankar – double violin
Bill Laswell – bass

Fred Frith – violin
Aiyb Dieng – percussion
Trilok Gurtu – tablas
Karl Berger – vibes, string arrangement
Ted Parsons – drums
Anton Fier – drums
Hahn Rowe – violin
J. G. Thirlwell – backing vocals
Mark Feldman & Larry Packer – violins
John Kass & Richard Carr – violas
Garo Yellin – cello

References

Albums produced by Bill Laswell
Albums produced by JG Thirlwell
Albums produced by Roli Mosimann
2003 compilation albums
Swans (band) compilation albums
Young God Records compilation albums
Albums produced by Michael Gira